The AVN Award for Transgender Performer of the Year (previously the AVN Award for Transsexual Performer of the Year) is presented every January in Las Vegas, Nevada at the AVN Awards ceremony. It represents the transgender pornographic film performer who has had the best body of work in the previous year. It has been given annually since 2004.

Vaniity was the first winner and first two-time winner; winning in 2004 and 2013. Venus Lux was the first back-to-back winner; winning in 2015 and 2016. Buck Angel is the only trans man to have won the award, winning in 2007.

Initially, winners were not presented the award on stage, with on-stage presentations first beginning with the 2013 award to Vaniity. As of January 2021, the titleholder is Aubrey Kate.

Winners and nominees

2000s

2010s

2020s

See also
 AVN Award for Male Performer of the Year
 AVN Award for Female Performer of the Year
 AVN Award for Male Foreign Performer of the Year

References

External links
 

Transgender Performer of the Year
Awards established in 2004
Awards for actresses
Acting awards
Transgender erotica